Uihlein Soccer Park is a 4,000-seat stadium in Milwaukee, Wisconsin built in 1994.

This stadium was originally the home of Milwaukee Rampage, then Milwaukee Wave United. The park has been host to many teams, including the US Women's National Team, and national teams from South Korea, the Netherlands, and Australia. In addition, the University of Wisconsin Badgers men's team has also utilized the park. The WIAA boys and girls state soccer championships have been played at Uihlein Soccer Park since 2003.

The surrounding pitches include 1 alternate stadium (Pat Jones Stadium), and as many as 11 full sided and 3 small sided fields. These pitches are used for tournaments and games for Milwaukee area soccer clubs. Uihlein Soccer Park was built as a joint venture between the city and the Milwaukee Kickers Soccer Club.

Uihlein Soccer Park has also been used for Lacrosse tournaments (Hot 4 Lax), Ultimate Frisbee games (Milwaukee Ultimate), and Hurling matches (Milwaukee Hurling Club).

The indoor building holds three indoor soccer fields measuring 182 feet by 84 feet each.

See also
 Parks of Milwaukee

External links
 Milwaukee Kickers Soccer Club

Sports venues in Milwaukee
Soccer venues in Wisconsin
Articles containing video clips
Sports complexes in the United States